In sumo, a  is the loincloth that  (sumo wrestlers) wear during training or in competition.

For top ranked professional , it is made of silk and comes in a variety of colours. Their number varies from 13 to 25, and is always an odd number.

Sometimes a  may wear his  in such a way as to give him some advantage over his opponent. He may wear it loosely to make it more difficult to be thrown, or he may wrap it tightly and splash a little water on it to help prevent his opponent from getting a good grip on it. His choice will depend on the type of techniques he prefers to employ in his bouts. Thus a wrestler preferring belt sumo will usually wear it more loosely, while those preferring pushing techniques will tend to wear the  more tightly.

Many  are superstitious and will change the color of their  to change their luck. Sometimes a poor performance will cause them to change colors for the next tournament, or even during a tournament, in an attempt to change their luck for the better. An example of this was done by Ōnoshō during the 2020 July tournament, when, after several losses in a row, he decided to change from crimson to dark gray.

 only wear the silk  during competitive bouts either during ranking tournaments or touring displays. During training, a heavy cotton  is worn. For senior  in the top two divisions (the so-called ), this belt is coloured white, and it is worn with one end distinctively looped at the front.  are not worn during training.

 ranked in the lower divisions wear a black cotton  both for training and in competition. In competition, cotton  are inserted into the belt, but these are not stiffened.

Amateur sumo wrestlers are expected to wear a white cotton  without the looping accorded to the senior professional's training garb.

If a wrestler's  comes off during a tournament bout, he is automatically disqualified. This is extremely rare, but did occur in May 2000, when  wrestler Asanokiri's  came off during a match with Chiyohakuhō. However, for most of sumo's history, whether or not a wrestler's  came off during a bout was considered irrelevant, and the policy of disqualification only came into place when Japan began adopting European attitudes towards nudity.

The silk 'belt' opens out at one end into a large apron which is usually heavily embroidered and with thick tassels at the bottom. Alternatively, some foreign-born  (such as Czech-born Takanoyama) bear their national flag on their . Popular  may be given many of these .

 have matching sets of three , with two being worn by his wrestler "assistants" (his  and ) during his ring entrance ceremony.

In the Edo period, the  also served as the wrestler's fighting . However, as the aprons become more ornate, eventually the two functions were split apart.

See also

 
 Glossary of sumo terms
 Kaupinam

References

Sumo terminology
Japanese lower-body garments